John Samuel Stephens (September 27, 1897 – March, 1991), nicknamed "Frank", was an American Negro league pitcher in the 1920s.

A native of Springettsbury Township, Pennsylvania, Stephens was the brother of fellow Negro leaguer Jake Stephens. Older brother Frank made his Negro leagues debut in 1921 with the Indianapolis ABCs, and went on to play with several other clubs through 1931. Stephens died in York, Pennsylvania in 1991 at age 93.

References

External links
 and Baseball-Reference Black Baseball stats and Seamheads

1897 births
1991 deaths
Bacharach Giants players
Birmingham Black Barons players
Chicago American Giants players
Cleveland Hornets players
Cuban House of David players
Cleveland Tigers (baseball) players
Indianapolis ABCs players
St. Louis Stars (baseball) players
Toledo Tigers players
20th-century African-American sportspeople
Baseball pitchers